Pragna Patel  is the Director of Southall Black Sisters a women's rights organisation in London, UK. She was a founding member, Chair and Director.

Patel is also a co-founder of Women Against Fundamentalism.

She trained as a lawyer and writes about race, gender and religion.

She has an honorary Doctorate from Keele University for her outstanding contribution to women’s rights and a Bob Hepple Equality award  alongside Mauro Cabral of GATE. The award is named for Bob Hepple, the former lawyer of Nelson Mandela.

She has said 'It is only through activism that that we can truly honour those who came before us to fight for the rights and freedoms that we currently enjoy and it is only through activism that can we encourage others to feel empowered and to form part of wider social movements that carry the promise of change.' 

In 2011 she was named as one of the Top 100 Women Activists and Campaigners.

References 

British activists
British legal scholars
Equality rights
Living people
Year of birth missing (living people)
British women's rights activists